The FIBA Asia Challenge, previously known as the FIBA Asia Stanković Cup between 2004 and 2010 and FIBA Asia Cup from 2012 to 2014,  is a basketball tournament which takes place every two years between teams from Asia.

History
The second tournament was supposed to be held in Damascus, Syria in 2006, but got cancelled due to political situation.

The champion is given an automatic berth to the following year's FIBA Asia Championship, while the next top three finishers would all receive additional berths for their FIBA Asia subzones.

During the FIBA Asia Central Board meeting last January 30-31, 2016, it was decided that this year's edition is the first step in the process of identifying the qualifiers for the 2017 FIBA Asia Cup (supposed to be the new name of the Asian Championship), the first-ever Continental Cup played jointly by teams from Asia and Oceania, thus renaming this tournament as FIBA Asia Challenge.

Summary

Medal table

Participating nations

See also
 FIBA Asia Championship

References

External links
 FIBA Asia official website

 
Basketball competitions in Asia between national teams
Recurring sporting events established in 2004
2004 establishments in Asia
Biennial sporting events
Asia Challenge